Catriel is a masculine given name.

People
 Catriel Soto (born 1987), Argentine cyclist
 Catriel Sánchez (born 1998), Argentine footballer
 Catriel Orcellet (born 1978), Argentine footballer

References

Masculine given names